Rashidabad (also Romanized as Rashīdābād) is a village in Aftab Rural District, Aftab District, Tehran County, Tehran Province, Iran. At the 2006 census, its population was 60, in 14 families.

References 

Populated places in Tehran County